Bhuntar is a town and a nagar panchayat in Kullu district  in the state of Himachal Pradesh, India. It is just 11 km from Kullu town, and lies along National Highway 3. The Kullu Airport is located in Bhuntar. Bhuntar is located on the right bank of the Beas River. Right opposite to Bhuntar, near the left bank of the Beas River, there is the confluence of the Parvati River with the River Beas. The Parvati Valley begins at this confluence and runs eastward, through a steep-sided valley towards Kasol and Manikaran.

Climate

Demographics
 India census, Bhuntar had a population of 5260. Males constitute 55% of the population and females 45%. Bhuntar has an average literacy rate of 80%, higher than the national average of 59.5%; with male literacy of 84% and female literacy of 76%. 11% of the population is under 6 years of age. Bhuntar has an Airport which connects big cities like Delhi via air. Bhuntar is center for accessing areas such as Kasol, Manikaran and Manali.

References

Cities and towns in Kullu district